Aerodrone is an American electro-rock band from Eugene, Oregon, that was founded in 2005 by Gary Zon. Aerodrone is a mix between new wave, rock, and electro, heavily influenced by both rock and electronic elements. According to interviews, Zon is responsible for composing much of the music digitally. The band has had a number of interchanging members, currently with Gary Zon on vocals, TZA on keyboards, and Joel Adkins on guitar.

Band Biography
Aerodrone quickly gained popularity on MySpace after becoming a featured band in the Summer of 2006. In Spring of 2007 the band signed a record deal with Cordless Recordings of Warner Music Group.. Since then, the band has had a deal with Myspace Records as well as other prominent outlets such as TrueAnthem.com, MTVU, and Hot Topic.

In 2011, Aerodrone's Ready to Love song was featured in Vector Stunt, a rhythm flash game.

Band members
Gary Zon: Vocals, Keys & Programming
TZA: keys/synth/vocoder
Joel Adkins: drums/hair

Studio
Gary Zon: Vocals / composition
Joel Adkins: Drums / guitar (2009–present)
Tonya Pugh: All keyboards (2007–present)
Kevin Patrick Miller: All guitars from 2005 until 2009

Discography
Aerodrone Demo - 2005
The Spin EP - 2006
Sceneboy EP - 2008
Ready To Love EP - 2010

External links
 (Archived)
Aerodrone Official Myspace Page
Aerodrone Official Purevolume Page

Musical groups established in 2005
Dance-punk musical groups
Musical groups from Eugene, Oregon
2005 establishments in Oregon